Alexandra Föderl-Schmid (born 30 January 1971) is an Austrian journalist and the first female editor of Der Standard.

Biography
Born in Haslach an der Mühl, Upper Austria, Föderl-Schmid studied at the University of Salzburg, followed by a doctorate in Communications Studies, also from the University of Salzburg.

Föderl-Schmid began at Austrian newspaper Der Standard in 1990 and was the newspaper's Germany correspondent and Brussels-based European Union correspondent.

She served as editor-in-chief of Der Standard from 2007 until 2017.  

Her other activities include:
 Re-Imagine Europa, Member of the Advisory Board
 Reuters Institute for the Study of Journalism (RISJ), Member of the Advisory Board
European Press Prize, Member of the panel of judges since 2014.

Awards and honors
 2005 – Austrian Press Agency Alfred Geiringer Fellowship, Reuters Institute

References

1971 births
Living people
Austrian journalists
Austrian women writers